The Labuan Maritime Museum is a museum located within the International Sea Sports Complex in Labuan, Malaysia.

History
The museum was opened in 2003.

Architecture
The museum is housed in a two-story shell-shaped building. It is divided into 16 galleries.

Exhibitions
The museum exhibits the marine life of Borneo.

Opening time
The museum opens every day from 9.00 a.m. to 6.00 p.m. free of charge.

See also
 List of museums in Malaysia

References

External links
 

Museums in Labuan
2003 establishments in Malaysia
Museums established in 2003